Glyphidocera umbrata is a moth in the family Autostichidae. It was described by Walsingham in 1911. It is found in Guatemala.

The wingspan is about 16 mm. The forewings are dark greyish brown with paler brownish cinereous sprinkling about the basal third, across the wing-middle, and
narrowly across the apical fifth in a line parallel to the termen. The hindwings are pale brownish cinereous.

References

Moths described in 1911
Glyphidocerinae